Vladimir Iosifovich Resin (born 21 February 1936) is a Russian politician who was the acting Mayor of Moscow, appointed by Russian president Dmitry Medvedev to succeed Yury Luzhkov on 28 September 2010. Resin previously served as the first deputy mayor under Luzhkov.

Biography 
Resin was born to a Jewish family on 21 February 1936 in Minsk. He graduated from the Moscow Mining Institute in 1958 and worked in the construction and mining sectors. In 1988, he started working in the Moscow city administration. He was the head of architecture and construction, as well as the acting mayor after Yuri Luzhkov's dismissal in September 2010. Soon after he joined the ruling United Russia party and was considered possible candidate for mayoralty. Resin kept his position of first deputy mayor for more than a year after Luzhkov's dismissal. In December 2011 he was elected member of the 6th State Duma of Russia. In the 8th convocation of Russia's lower house Resin is the oldest member.

Resin has a penchant for expensive wristwatches the most expensive recognized by experts as Swiss-made DeWitt, La Pressy Grande Complication, costing more than $1 million.

He is one of the members of the State Duma the United States Treasury sanctioned on 24 March 2022 in response to the 2022 Russian invasion of Ukraine.

References

External links
Official biography

1936 births
Belarusian Jews
Jewish mayors of places in Russia
Living people
Mayors of Moscow
Politicians from Minsk
Recipients of the Order of Friendship (South Ossetia)
Academicians of the Russian Academy of Architecture and Construction Sciences and its forerunners
Full Cavaliers of the Order "For Merit to the Fatherland"
Recipients of the Order of Honour (Russia)
State Prize of the Russian Federation laureates
Recipients of the USSR State Prize
United Russia politicians
Economists from Moscow
21st-century Russian politicians
Sixth convocation members of the State Duma (Russian Federation)
Seventh convocation members of the State Duma (Russian Federation)
Eighth convocation members of the State Duma (Russian Federation)
Russian individuals subject to the U.S. Department of the Treasury sanctions
Moscow State Mining University alumni